Juraj Tužinský (born 24 August 1984) is a Slovak sport shooter who competes in the men's 10 metre air pistol. At the 2012 Summer Olympics, he finished 15th in the qualifying round, failing to make the cut for the final.

References

Slovak male sport shooters
1984 births
Living people
Olympic shooters of Slovakia
Shooters at the 2012 Summer Olympics
Shooters at the 2015 European Games
Shooters at the 2016 Summer Olympics
Shooters at the 2019 European Games
Shooters at the 2020 Summer Olympics
European Games bronze medalists for Slovakia
European Games medalists in shooting
People from Lučenec
Sportspeople from the Banská Bystrica Region